2009 Regional League Division 2 Northern Region is the 3rd Level League in Thailand. In 2009, contains 11 clubs from Northern region.

Stadium and locations

Final league table

Results

See also
 2009 Regional League Division 2 North Eastern Region
 2009 Regional League Division 2 Central & Eastern Region
 2009 Regional League Division 2 Bangkok Metropolitan Region
 2009 Regional League Division 2 Southern Region

References

External links
  Football Association of Thailand

Regional League Northern Division seasons
Nor